Stewartia floridana is a bivalve of the family Lucinidae that is chemosymbiotic with sulfur-oxidizing bacteria.

Distribution
This marine species occurs off Florida.

References

Distel, D. & Felbeck, H. (1987). Endosymbiosis in the lucinid clams Lucinoma aequizonata, Lucinoma annulata, and Lucina floridana: a reexamination of the functional morphology of the gills as bacteria-bearing organs. Marine Biology, 96, 79-86.
Fisher, M. & Hand, S. (1984). Chemoautotrophic symbionts in the bivalve Lucina floridana from seagrass beds. Biological Bulletin, 167, 445-459.
Olsson, A. & Harbison, A. (1953). Pliocene Mollusca of southern Florida: With special reference to those from North Saint Petersburg. Academy of Natural Sciences, Philadelphia.
 Turgeon, D. D., W. G. Lyons, P. Mikkelsen, G. Rosenberg, and F. Moretzsohn. 2009. Bivalvia (Mollusca) of the Gulf of Mexico, Pp. 711–744 in Felder, D.L. and D.K. Camp (eds.), Gulf of Mexico–Origins, Waters, and Biota. Biodiversity. Texas A&M Press, College
 Taylor J. & Glover E. (2021). Biology, evolution and generic review of the chemosymbiotic bivalve family Lucinidae. London: The Ray Society [Publication 182]. 319 pp.

External links
 Conrad, T. A. (1833). Descriptions of new, recent and Miocene shells. The American Journal of Science and Arts. 23: 339–346
  Reeve, L. A. (1850-1851). Monograph of the genus Lucina. In: Conchologia Iconica, or, illustrations of the shells of molluscous animals, vol. 6, pl. 1-11 and unpaginated text. L. Reeve & Co., London
 aylor J.D. & Glover E.A. (2016). Lucinid bivalves of Guadeloupe: diversity and systematics in the context of the tropical Western Atlantic (Mollusca: Bivalvia: Lucinidae). Zootaxa. 4196(3): 301-380.

Lucinidae
Bivalves described in 1833